Amazon Prime Video is a global on-demand Internet streaming media provider, owned and operated by Amazon, that distributes a number of original programs that includes original series, specials, miniseries, documentaries, and films.

TV shows

Drama

Comedy

Animation

Adult animation

Anime

Kids & family

Non-English language

Scripted

Unscripted

Upcoming

Films

Upcoming

Notes

References

Amazon
Amazon
Amazon (company)